"Raging" is a 2016 song by Norwegian DJ and record producer Kygo from his debut studio album, Cloud Nine. It was released as the second promotional single from the album on 1 April 2016, becoming later the fifth single from the album. The song features Irish rock band Kodaline. "Raging" also includes writing credits from James Bay.

Composition
"Raging" is a tropical house song written in the key of D# minor. It runs at 100 BPM.

Music video

The music video for the song was released to YouTube on 23 May 2016. It was directed by Ariel Elia and produced by Dan Klabin. The video also features a sequel, "I'm in Love" featuring James Vincent McMorrow, which was a promotional single for the album.

In popular culture
The song is featured in the soundtrack of EA Sports video game FIFA 17.

Charts

Weekly charts

Year-end charts

Certifications

Release history

References

2016 singles
2016 songs
Kodaline songs
Kygo songs
Folktronica songs
Song recordings produced by Kygo
Songs written by Derek Fuhrmann
Songs written by Kygo
Songs written by James Bay (singer)
Sony Music singles
Torch songs